Stranje is a village in the hills northwest of Senovo in the Municipality of Krško in eastern Slovenia. The area is part of the traditional region of Styria. It is now included with the rest of the municipality in the Lower Sava Statistical Region.

Mass grave
Stranje is the site of a mass grave from the Second World War. The Stranje Mass Grave is located in a depression in the woods above the house at Stranje no. 17. Two grave sites at the location are marked with crosses. They contain the remains of four or five people that intended to join the Partisans. However, the Partisans suspected them of betrayal and shot them instead. The remains of multiple victims were confirmed by tests at the site in 2010.

Church
The local church is dedicated to Saint Achacius and belongs to the Parish of Brestanica. It was built in 1494 and restyled in the Baroque style in the 18th century.

References

External links

Stranje on Geopedia

Populated places in the Municipality of Krško